The Vascones were a pre-Roman tribe who, on the arrival of the Romans in the 1st century, inhabited a territory that spanned between the upper course of the Ebro river and the southern basin of the western Pyrenees, a region that coincides with present-day Navarre, western Aragon and northeastern La Rioja, in the Iberian Peninsula. The Vascones are often considered ancestors of the present-day Basques to whom they left their name.

Territory

Roman period 

The description of the territory which the Vascones inhabited during ancient times appears in texts of classical authors, between the 1st century BC and the 2nd century AD, such as Livy, Strabo, Pliny the Elder and Ptolemy. Although these texts have been studied as sources of reference, some authors have pointed out the apparent lack of uniformity and also the existence of contradictions within the texts, in particular with Strabo.

The oldest document corresponds to Livy (59 BC - AD 17), who in a brief passage of his work about the 76 BC Sertorian War relates how after crossing the Ebro and the city of Calagurris Nasica, they crossed the flatlands of the Vascones, or Vasconum agrum until reaching the border of their immediate neighbors, the Berones. Comparing other sections of this same document, it is deduced that this border was located to the west, while the southern neighbors of the Vascones were the Celtiberians, with their city, Contrebia Leucade.

Pliny the Elder, on his work Natural History, mentioned a text prior to 50 BC that located the Vascones at the western end of the Pyrenees, neighbors of the Varduli and extended to the mountains of Oiarso and into the coasts of the Bay of Biscay, in an area he called Vasconum saltus. The Greek geographer Strabo, in the times of Augustus (63 BC - AD 14) refers to the Vascones (in Ancient Greek: Ούασκώνων) placing their main city, or polis, in Pompaelo and as well Callagurris.

This information is found again in the works of Ptolemy, who lived during the 1st and 2nd Century AD. In his book, Geōgraphikḕ Hyphḗgēsis, chapter 6, he relates the names of 15 cities inside the territory of the Vascones, besides Oiarso: Iturissa, Pompaelo, Bituris, Andelos, Nemanturissa, Curnonium, Iacca, Graccurris, Calagurris, Cascantum, Ercavica, Tarraga, Muscaria, Seguia and Alavona.

The territory of the Vascones during the Roman republic and Roman empire corresponded with present-day Navarre, the northeast extreme of Gipuzkoa, and parts of La Rioja, Zaragoza and Huesca, including the city of Calagurris.

3rd and 4th centuries

Late Basquisation 

During this period, after the time of Ptolemy and contemporary to the times of instability caused by the Germanic invasions, the documents about the Vascones and other tribes of the northern Iberian Peninsula are scarce, and as a result there is little information about the Vascones during this time.

The chronicler John of Biclaro (c. 540 – after 621) mentions the Vascones in a story about the foundation of the city of Victoriacum by the Visigoth king Liuvigild and Gregory of Tours (538–594) mentions the incursions of Wascones in Aquitaine during the year 587. From these extracts and being the neighboring tribes absent in the historiography, Adolf Schulten (1870–1960) proposed the theory according to which, at some point between the mid-2nd century and late 4th century, an enlargement of the territory of the Vascones took place, first in the west, occupying the lands of the Caristii, Varduli and Autrigones, and later in the north in Aquitaine. Schulten considers this to be the reason for the adoption of the name Gascony, which derives from Gascon, which comes from Vascon, and used to denominate a region that includes the present-day Northern Basque Country.

Claudio Sánchez Albornoz, Spanish historian (1893–1984), on his work "Los vascones vasconizan la depresión vasca" (The Vascones "basquize" the Basque depression) published in 1972 expanded upon this hypothesis, relying on linguistic analysis: when invading the territories of what today is Biscay, Gipuzkoa and Álava displaced to Castile part of the Caristii, Varduli and Autrigones, who took refuge in the mountains; the ones who had not been displaced were "Basquized", while perhaps the Caristii, Varduli and Autrigones already spoke languages similar or related to the Basque language.

However, research during last decades has called into question the possibility of an expansion northwards (J.J. Larrea). The inroad of the Vascones onto the plains of Aquitaine in 587 seems to be short-lived—they make their way back to the mountains—and archaeological findings in Eauze or Auch do not reveal instability or destruction during the alleged expanding period up to the mid-7th century. Another theory suggests a contemporary identification made by the Goths and the Franks of the Vascones (the most dynamic tribe) with all Basque speaking, Basque-related, or non-Romanized tribes.

7th century 

Starting in the 7th century, historians differentiate between Spagnovasconia, located southwestern of the Pyrenees, inside the Iberian Peninsula and Guasconia, northwestern of the Pyrenees, in Aquitaine. Schulten interprets that by this time the Vascones had already retreated from their territories in Roman times and started occupying lands in the north, what in the future would make the Southern Basque Country and northern Navarre. Schulten also quotes the chronicle from Einhard, Vita Karoli Magni, dated in 810, where for the first time is used the term navarrese to define the people living in the former territories of the Vascones near the Ebro.

History

Roman period

Unlike the Aquitanians or Cantabrians, the Vascones seemed to have negotiated their status in the Roman Empire. In the Sertorian War, Pompey established his headquarters in their territory, founding Pompaelo. Romanization was rather intense in the area known as Ager Vasconum (the Ebro valley) but limited in the mountainous Saltus, where evidence of Roman civilization appears only in mining places, harbours, roads, and milestones, e.g. Oiasso. The territory was also important for Romans as a communication knot between northern Hispania and southwestern Gallia, who took good care to station detachments in different spots of the main communication lines.

The Vasconian area presents indications of upheaval (burnt villas, an abundance of mints to pay the garrisons) during the 4th and 5th centuries that have been linked by many historians to the Bagaudae rebellions against feudalization, but also to the depredations of migrating Germanic and Asian tribes—Vandals, Alans, Sueves, Visigoths, possibly Heruls—into Hispania.

Late Antiquity and Early Middle Ages

In AD 407 Vascon troops fought on the orders of Roman commanders Didimus and Verinianus, repelling an attack by Vandals, Alans and Suebi. In 409, the passage of the Germanic peoples and Sarmatians toward Hispania went unhindered. The Roman reaction to this invasion and unrest related to the Bagaudae was to give Gallia Aquitania and Hispania Tarraconensis to the Visigoths in return for their services as allies by treaty (foederati). The Visigoths soon managed to expel the Vandals to Africa.

After chronicler Hydatius´s death in 469, no contemporary source exists reporting on the social and political situation in the Vasconias, as put by himself. At the beginning of the fourth century, Calagurris is still cited as a Vascon town. During the fifth and sixth centuries, the gap between town and the rural milieu widened, with the former falling much in decay. Between 581-7, chronicles start to mention the Vascones again, this time hailing from the wilderness, as opposed to the towns, which remained attached to Roman culture or were under Germanic influence. By the seventh to eighth centuries, Vascones were not confined to their ancient boundaries, but covered a much larger territory, from Álava in the west to the Loire in the north. The island of Oléron, along with the Île de Ré, formed the Vacetae Insulae "Vacetian Islands" according to the Cosmographia, where Vaceti are Vascones by another name. The concept underlying the medieval name points to a much wider reality than Strabo's former tribal definition, this time encompassing all Basque-speaking tribes.

The independent Vascones stabilised their first polity under the Merovingian Franks: the Duchy of Vasconia, whose borders to the south remained unclear. This duchy would eventually become Gascony. During the reincorporation of Vasconia into Francia after 769, Charlemagne destroyed the walls of Pamplona after a failed attempt to conquer Zaragoza, the Vascones annihilated his rearguard in the Battle of Roncevaux Pass in 778—referred as "wasconicam perfidiam" by Frankish chroniclers. Pamplona was later captured by the Cordovan emir 'Abd al-Rahman I (781), but taken over by the Franks in 806, who assigned its government to a pro-Frankish local Belasko ("al-Galashki"), probably a Basque hailing from present-day Gascony. Some decades later, in 824, a second battle of Roncevaux took place that led to the establishment of the Kingdom of Pamplona, founded with Eneko Arista as head of the new polity, presented by Arab sources as leader of the Vascones (al-Baskunisi). However, the 824 Carolingian expedition itself included two different columns made up of Frankish and Vascones (Gascons).

After the 9th century, the Vascones (Wascones, Guascones) come to be more closely identified in the records with the current territory of Gascony, at the time still a Basque-speaking territory but progressively being replaced by the new rising Romance language, Gascon.

Culture

Language and writing 

Several authors point out that prior to the Roman arrival and alike other peoples that inhabited the near region, the Vascones spoke a language that linguists identify as the precursor of the modern Basque language, sometimes referred to as Proto-Basque language or Aquitanian language.

However, as pointed out by Henrike Knörr (1947-2008) the origin and kinship of the Basque language is still a mystery and an object of research. There are several theories about its origin; the Basque linguistic Koldo Mitxelena argues that an "in-situ" origin is the most likely, and thus explains the current dialectical classification while other theories advocate for a proposed kinship between the Basque language and other language families, like the languages of the Caucasus or a relation between Basque and the extinct Iberian language. So far, possible connections between Basque and other languages have remained unproven.

Another problem that arises in the study of the language of the Vascones is the lack of direct classic records regarding the language spoken by this people, with the exception of a vague description by Strabo and Pomponius Mela, or the description made by Julius Caesar on the language of the Aquitanians in his work Commentarii de Bello Gallico.

The study of epigraphic documents has been of greater interest, as some of them date the introduction of writing among the Vascones in the 2nd century. Among them, the oldest are the numismatic evidence coming from both Vasconic mints and others located nearby. A great importance is given to a funerary stele found in the Hermitage of Santa Bárbara in Lerga, which was considered to be the oldest known written testimony of the Proto-Basque language until an inscription from the 1st century BC was found in 2022. It is also believed that the Iberian language has left some traces on the Basque language, as with the Iberian term ili, adopted in Basque as hiri with the meaning of town or city, and present in the Vasconic name for the city of Pompaelo: "Iruña", as well as in other names of cities and towns.

Religion 

The epigraphic and archaeological testimonies have allowed experts to determine some of the religious practices that were present among the Vascones since the Roman arrival and the introduction of writing. According to research done on this topic, religious syncretism lasted until the 1st Century; from that moment onwards and until the adoption of Christianity between the 4th and 5th centuries, Roman mythology was predominant.

Vasconic theonyms have been found on tombstones and altars, which further proves the syncretism between the pre-Christian Roman systems of beliefs and the Vasconic religions. Two altars have been found in Ujué, one dedicated to Lacubegi, identified as the God of the lower world and another one dedicated to Jupiter, although it has not been possible to date them. In Lerate and Barbarin two tombstones have been found, both dedicated to Stelaitse and dated in the 1st century.

See also
Pre-Roman peoples of the Iberian Peninsula

Notes

References
Collins, Roger. "The Vaccaei, the Vaceti, and the rise of Vasconia." Studia Historica VI. Salamanca, 1988. Reprinted in Roger Collins, Law, Culture and Regionalism in Early Medieval Spain. Variorum, 1992. .

Sorauren, Mikel. Historia de Navarra, el Estado Vasco. Pamiela Ed., 1998. .

External links
Vascones in the Auñamendi Encyclopedia, by Bernardo Estornés Lasa.

Pre-Roman peoples of the Iberian Peninsula
Basque history